Alexa Irvin (born 20 July) is a Canadian sprint kayaker. She is the current Pan American Games champion in the women's K-4 500 metres, she won gold together with Andréanne Langlois, Alanna Bray-Lougheed, and Anna Negulic at the 2019 Pan American Games. Irvin also won gold in the K-4 500 metres at the 2011 Pan American Games.

References

1992 births
Canadian female canoeists
Canoeists at the 2019 Pan American Games
Living people
People from Prince Rupert, British Columbia
Sportspeople from British Columbia
Pan American Games medalists in canoeing
Pan American Games gold medalists for Canada
Medalists at the 2019 Pan American Games